Dvuhyurtochnoe Lake is a freshwater lake in the Ust-Kamchatka region of the Kamchatka Territory, Russia. The lake has a glacial-barren origin. It resulted from the lowering of a small section of the river valley.

The lake is a widening of the Dvukhyurtochnaya River, which flows through it from west to east. To the north of the confluence of the Dvukhyurtochnaya River, two thermal springs flow into it. This lake is one of the spawning reservoirs of the peninsula. Above the northern shore of the lake stands the   Olney Volcano.

References

Lakes of Kamchatka Krai